Penaea sarcocolla is a species of shrub in the genus Penaea. It is endemic to the Western Cape, along the coast up to Cape Agulhas and extending inland to Franschhoek, Hottentots Holland Mountains, Villiersdorp and Genadendal. It is also known as the Cape fellwort.

References 

Penaeaceae